Sleepy Hollow Cemetery in Sleepy Hollow, New York, is the final resting place of numerous famous figures, including Washington Irving, whose 1820 short story "The Legend of Sleepy Hollow" is set in the adjacent burying ground at the Old Dutch Church of Sleepy Hollow. Incorporated in 1849 as Tarrytown Cemetery, the site posthumously honored Irving's request that it change its name to Sleepy Hollow Cemetery. It was listed on the National Register of Historic Places in 2009.

History
It is contiguous with, but separate from, the churchyard of the Old Dutch Church, the colonial-era church that was a setting for "The Legend of Sleepy Hollow". The Rockefeller family estate (Kykuit), whose grounds abut Sleepy Hollow Cemetery, contains the private Rockefeller cemetery.

In 1894 under the leadership of Marcius D. Raymond, publisher of the local Tarrytown Argus newspaper, funds were raised to build a granite monument honoring the soldiers of the American Revolutionary War buried in the cemetery.

Notable monuments

The Helmsley mausoleum, final resting place of Harry and Leona Helmsley, features a window showing the skyline of Manhattan in stained glass.  It was built by Mrs. Helmsley at a cost of $1.4 million in 2007.  She had her husband's body moved from its resting place in Woodlawn Cemetery (Bronx, New York) to the new mausoleum.

Notable burials 

Numerous notable people are interred at Sleepy Hollow Cemetery, including:

 Viola Allen (1867–1948), actress
 John Dustin Archbold (1848–1916), a director of the Standard Oil Company
 Elizabeth Arden (1878–1966), businesswoman who built a cosmetics empire
 Brooke Astor (1902–2007), philanthropist and socialite
 Vincent Astor (1891–1959), philanthropist; member of the Astor family
 Leo Baekeland (1863–1944), the father of plastic; Bakelite is named for him. The murder of his grandson's wife Barbara by his great-grandson, Tony, is told in the book Savage Grace
 Robert Livingston Beeckman (1866–1935), American politician and Governor of Rhode Island
 Marty Bergen (1869-1906), American National Champion Thoroughbred racing jockey
 Holbrook Blinn (1872–1928), American actor
 Henry E. Bliss (1870–1955), devised the Bliss library classification system
 Artur Bodanzky (1877–1939), conductor at New York Metropolitan Opera
 Major Edward Bowes (1874–1946), early radio star, he hosted Major Bowes' Amateur Hour
 Alice Brady (1892–1939), American actress
 Andrew Carnegie (1835–1919), businessman and philanthropist; monument by Scots sculptor George Henry Paulin
 Louise Whitfield Carnegie (1857–1946), wife of Andrew Carnegie
 Walter Chrysler (1875–1940), businessman, commissioned the Chrysler Building and founded the Chrysler Corporation
 Francis Pharcellus Church (1839–1906), editor at The New York Sun who penned the editorial "Yes, Virginia, there is a Santa Claus"
 William Conant Church (1836–1917), co-founder of Armed Forces Journal and the National Rifle Association
 Henry Sloane Coffin (1877–1954), teacher, minister, and author
 William Sloane Coffin, Sr. (1879–1933), businessman
 Kent Cooper (1880–1965), influential head of the Associated Press from 1925 to 1948
 Jasper Francis Cropsey (1823–1900), landscape painter and architect; designed the now-demolished New York City Sixth Avenue elevated railroad stations
 Floyd Crosby (1899–1985), Oscar-winning cinematographer, father of musician David Crosby
 Geraldine Rockefeller Dodge (1882–1973), heiress and patron of the arts
 William H. Douglas (1853–1944), U.S. Representative from New York
 Maud Earl (1864–1943), British-American painter of canines
 Parker Fennelly (1891–1988), American actor
 Malcolm Webster Ford (1862–1902), champion amateur athlete and journalist; brother of Paul, he took his own life after slaying his brother.
 Paul Leicester Ford (1865–1902), editor, bibliographer, novelist, and biographer; brother of Malcolm Webster Ford by whose hand he died
 Dixon Ryan Fox (1887–1945), educator and president of Union College, New York
 Herman Frasch (1851–1914), engineer, the Sulphur King
 Samuel Gompers (1850–1924), founder of the American Federation of Labor
 Madison Grant (1865–1937), eugenicist and conservationist, author of The Passing of the Great Race
 Moses Hicks Grinnell (1803–1877), congressman and Central Park Commissioner
 Walter S. Gurnee (1805–1903), mayor of Chicago
 Angelica Hamilton (1784–1857), the older of two daughters of Alexander Hamilton
 James Alexander Hamilton (1788–1878), third son of Alexander Hamilton
 Robert Havell, Jr. (1793–1878), British-American engraver who printed and colored John James Audubon's monumental Birds of America series, also painter in the style of the Hudson River School
 Mark Hellinger (1903–1947), primarily known as a journalist of New York theatre. The Mark Hellinger Theatre in New York City is named for him; produced The Naked City, a 1948 film noir
 Harry Helmsley (1909–1997), real estate mogul who built a company that became one of the biggest property holders in the United States, and his wife Leona Helmsley (1920–2007), in a mausoleum with a stained-glass panorama of the Manhattan skyline. Leona famously bequeathed $12 million to her dog.
 Eliza Hamilton Holly (1799–1859), younger daughter of Alexander Hamilton
 Raymond Mathewson Hood (1881–1934), architect
 William Howard Hoople (1868–1922), a leader of the nineteenth-century American Holiness movement; the co-founder of the Association of Pentecostal Churches of America, and one of the early leaders of the Church of the Nazarene
 Washington Irving (1783–1859), author of "The Legend of Sleepy Hollow" and "Rip Van Winkle"
 William Irving (1766–1821), U.S. Congressman from New York
 George Jones (1811–1891), co-founder of The New York Times
 Albert Lasker (1880–1952), pioneer of the American advertising industry, part owner of baseball team the Chicago Cubs, and wife Mary Lasker (1900–1994), an American health activist and recipient of the Presidential Medal of Freedom and the Congressional Gold Medal
 Walter W. Law, Jr. (1871–1958), lawyer and politician, son of Briarcliff Manor founder Walter W. Law
 Lewis Edward Lawes (1883–1947), Reformist warden of Sing Sing prison
 William E. Le Roy (1818–1888), United States Navy rear admiral
 Ann Lohman (1812–1878),  Madame Restell, 19th century purveyor of patent medicine and abortions
 Charles D. Millard (1873–1944), member of U.S. House of Representatives from New York
 Darius Ogden Mills (1825–1910), made a fortune during California's gold rush and expanded his wealth further through New York City real estate
 Belle Moskowitz (1877–1933), political advisor and social activist
 Robertson Kirtland Mygatt (1861–1919), noted American Landscape painter, part of the Tonalist movement in Impressionism
 N. Holmes Odell (1828–1904), U.S. Representative from New York
 George Washington Olvany (1876–1952), New York General Sessions Court judge and leader of Tammany Hall
 William Orton (1826–1878), President of Western Union
 Whitelaw Reid (1837–1912), journalist and editor of the New-York Tribune, Vice Presidential candidate with Benjamin Harrison in 1892, defeated by Adlai E. Stevenson I; son-in-law of D.O. Mills
 William Rockefeller (1841–1922), New York head of the Standard Oil Company
 Edgar Evertson Saltus (1855–1921), American novelist
 Francis Saltus Saltus (1849–1889), American decadent poet & bohemian
 Carl Schurz (1820–1906), senator, secretary of the interior under Rutherford B. Hayes. Carl Schurz Park in New York City bears his name
 Charles Sheeler (1883–1965), painter and photographer, and his wife Musya (1908–1981), photographer, are buried together.
 William G. Stahlnecker (1849–1902), U.S. Representative from New York
 Egerton Swartwout (1870–1943), New York architect
 William Boyce Thompson (1869–1930), founder of Newmont Mining Corporation and financier
 Joseph Urban (1872–1933), architect and theatre set designer
 Henry Villard (1835–1900), railroad baron whose monument was created by Karl Bitter.
 Oswald Garrison Villard (1872–1949), son of Henry Villard and grandson of William Lloyd Garrison; one of the founders of the National Association for the Advancement of Colored People
 William A. Walker (1805–1861), U.S. Representative from New York
 Paul Warburg (1868–1932), German-American banker and early advocate of the U.S. Federal Reserve system.
 Worcester Reed Warner (1846–1929), mechanical engineer and manufacturer of telescopes
 Thomas J. Watson (1874–1956), transformed a small manufacturer of adding machines into IBM
 Hans Zinsser (1878–1940), microbiologist and a prolific author

In popular culture
Several outdoor scenes from the feature film House of Dark Shadows (1970) were filmed at the cemetery's receiving vault. The cemetery also served as a location for the Ramones' music video "Pet Sematary".

See also
 National Register of Historic Places listings in northern Westchester County, New York

References

Bibliography

External links 

 
 
 
 

 
1849 establishments in New York (state)
Buildings and structures completed in 1849
Cemeteries on the National Register of Historic Places in New York (state)
Cemeteries in Westchester County, New York
Historic districts in Westchester County, New York
Historic districts on the National Register of Historic Places in New York (state)
National Register of Historic Places in Westchester County, New York
U.S. Route 9
Mount Pleasant, New York
Dark Shadows
American Revolutionary War sites
Monuments and memorials in New York (state)